Joseph Stuart Patrick Hamilton (13 September 1918 – 26 August 1990) was an Australian rules footballer who played with Hawthorn in the Victorian Football League (VFL).

Family
The son of Alexander Hamilton (1886–1922) and Jane Elizabeth Hamilton, née McGiffin (1893–1981), Joseph Stuart Patrick Hamilton was born at Carrickfergus near Belfast in Northern Ireland on 13 September 1918. His father died when he was three and his mother subsequently remarried to Charles Crandles, and the entire family immigrated to Victoria, Australia in May 1931.

Stuart Hamilton married Margaret Mary Doran (1921–2004) in 1942.

War service
During World War II, Hamilton initially served in the Volunteer Defence Corps of the Australian Army before serving in the Royal Australian Air Force for the final years of the war.

Football career
Recruited from Bentleigh, Hamilton played 58 games for Hawthorn over five seasons. He subsequently coached Nathalia in the Goulburn Valley League.

Honours and achievements 
Individual
 Hawthorn life member

Notes

External links 

1918 births
1990 deaths
Australian rules footballers from Melbourne
Hawthorn Football Club players
People from Carrickfergus
Northern Ireland emigrants to Australia
People from Glen Huntly, Victoria
VFL/AFL players born outside Australia
Sportspeople from County Antrim
Royal Australian Air Force personnel of World War II
Australian Army personnel of World War II
Military personnel from Melbourne
Irish players of Australian rules football